Great Linford railway station was a railway station on the Wolverton to Newport Pagnell line. It served the village of Great Linford, Buckinghamshire, which it was located a little to the northeast of. Built next to the Linford Wharf on the Grand Union Canal, the station opened to traffic in 1867. The station consisted of a brick built station building, and single platform. The station did not have a goods yard or sidings.

The last passenger train ran on 5 September 1964 and the last goods train passed through on 22 May 1967. The station building was demolished although the platform remains intact to this day. The trackbed through the station has been converted into a cycle way, forming part of the Milton Keynes redway system.

See also

References

External links 
 Station on Disused Stations
 The station on navigable 1946 O. S. map
Oral history of the Station Mistress at Great Linford Station Ena Walters

Disused railway stations in Buckinghamshire
Former London and North Western Railway stations
Railway stations in Great Britain opened in 1867
Railway stations in Great Britain closed in 1964
Beeching closures in England
Railway stations in Milton Keynes